Emmanuello is an Italian surname. Notable people with the surname include:

 Daniele Emmanuello (1963–2007), Italian mobster
 Simone Emmanuello (born 1994), Italian footballer

See also
 Emmanuelle (given name)

Italian-language surnames